Halona or Hālona may refer to:

Hawai'ian language
Hālona Blowhole, a geologic formation in Hawai'i
Halona Cove, a location in Oahu used in From Here to Eternity

Zuni language
Halona, one of the mythic Seven Cities of Gold
Halona Pueblo, or Zuni Pueblo, a geologic formation in New Mexico